Sanskar is a day boarding, co-educational and English speaking educational institution in India. The school takes children from 3 years plus to 18 years i.e. Nursery to 10+2 CBSE and International Syllabus.

Location
The school is situated on Jodhpur-Jaisalmer Rajasthan bypass 8 km. from the city of Jodhpur in Marudhar belt.

Infrastructure and facilities
The school has a large campus and playground, modern kitchen, spacious classroom, good student-teacher ratio, closed circuit installations, a computer laboratory, a library, and a clinic.

Sports and activities
These include:
Swimming
Squash
Tennis
Cricket
Basketball
Football
Hockey
Skating
Volleyball
Baseball
Ball badminton
Judo
Karate
Gymnastics
Indoor Games
Field Trips

External links
 Sanskar International School

International schools in India
Schools in Jodhpur